Randall Max Ready (born January 8, 1960) is a former professional baseball player and former manager for the Jacksonville Jumbo Shrimp. He was a minor league coach for the Detroit Tigers and served as a minor league coach for the Padres.

Professional playing days
Ready played in Puerto Rico's winter league for the Indios de Mayagüez in 1985–86. On June 12, 1986, Ready was traded by the Milwaukee Brewers to the San Diego Padres for a player to be named later. On October 29, 1986, the Padres sent Tim Pyznarski to the Milwaukee Brewers to complete the trade.

Only days after his trade to San Diego, Ready's wife Doreen suffered a heart attack that caused brain damage. At the time the Readys had three children. Four years later, Ready was awarded $24.7 million by a jury that ruled  a physician who had prescribed diet pills to Doreen Ready was responsible for the heart attack she had suffered.

On June 2, 1989, he was traded by the San Diego Padres with John Kruk to the Philadelphia Phillies for Chris James.

On April 28, 1991, Ready was on the verge of completing a rare unassisted triple play.  In the first inning of a game against the San Diego Padres, Ready caught a line drive hit by Tony Gwynn, stepped on second to force out Paul Faries and could have easily tagged out Tony Fernández for the third and final out, but he elected to throw the ball to first baseman Ricky Jordan. It was the Phillies' first triple-play in the history of Veterans Stadium.

Career statistics
In 777 games over 13 seasons, Ready posted a .259 batting average (547-for-2110) with 312 runs, 107 doubles, 21 triples, 40 home runs, 239 RBI, 326 bases on balls, .359 on-base percentage and 
.387 slugging percentage. He finished his career with a .966 fielding percentage playing at first, second and third base and left and right field.

Managing career
Ready returned to baseball as a manager for the Oneonta Tigers in 2002–2003, where he was named the New York–Penn League Manager of the Year after leading the Tigers to a 47–27 (.635) record and a division title 2002. Ready returned to the San Diego Padres minor league system and served as manager of the Fort Wayne Wizards (Class A, Fort Wayne, Indiana) from 2004 until 2006. In 2007, Ready was named the manager of the San Antonio Missions (Class AA, San Antonio, Texas) for their inaugural season with the San Diego Padres organization. He led the team to a 73–66 (.525) record and the Texas League championship. On December 14, 2007, Ready was named the manager of the Portland Beavers (Class AAA, Portland, Oregon), a position he held until being named the hitting coach of the San Diego Padres on July 31, 2009. Following the 2009 season, Ready was a candidate to be the next manager of the Houston Astros, however the position was filled by Brad Mills.

The Padres finished the 2011 season with a 71–91 record while hitting a major league-low 91 home runs and finishing last in the National League (and next to last in MLB) in batting average (.237) and OPS (.653). They scored the third fewest runs in MLB, and they were shut out 19 times. Ready was fired by the Padres after the end of the season.

In 2012, he was the Texas Rangers' minor league hitting coordinator.

On November 12, 2012, Ready was hired to be the next manager for the Atlanta Braves' Triple-A affiliate, Gwinnett. He was replaced by Brian Snitker on October 14, 2013.

On January 8, 2016, Ready was hired to be the next manager for the Miami Marlins' Single-A affiliate, Jupiter Hammerheads.

Ready was named as the manager for the Jacksonville Jumbo Shrimp in the Miami Marlins organization for the 2018 season. In 2019, he was replaced by Kevin Randel.

References

External links

Randy Ready at SABR (Baseball BioProject)

1960 births
Living people
American expatriate baseball players in Canada
American expatriate baseball players in Japan
Baseball players from California
Burlington Bees players
Butte Copper Kings players
Cal State East Bay Pioneers baseball players
Chiba Lotte Marines players
Colorado Mesa Mavericks baseball players
El Paso Diablos players
Lake Elsinore Storm players
Las Vegas Stars (baseball) players
Major League Baseball second basemen
Major League Baseball third basemen
Milwaukee Brewers players
Montreal Expos players
Nippon Professional Baseball outfielders
Oakland Athletics players
Ottawa Lynx players
People from Fremont, California
Philadelphia Phillies players
Portland Beavers managers
Rochester Red Wings players
San Antonio Missions managers
San Diego Padres players
Vancouver Canadians players